Protein ERGIC-53 also known as ER-Golgi intermediate compartment 53 kDa protein or lectin mannose-binding 1 is a protein that in humans is encoded by the LMAN1 gene.

Function 

ERGIC-53 (also named LMAN1) is a type I integral membrane protein localized in the intermediate region (ERGIC) between the endoplasmic reticulum and the Golgi, presumably recycling between the two compartments. The protein is a mannose-specific lectin and is a member of a novel family of plant lectin homologs in the secretory pathway of animal cells. Mutations in the gene are associated with a coagulation defect. Using positional cloning, the gene was identified as the disease gene leading to combined deficiency of factor V-factor VIII, a rare, autosomal recessive disorder in which both coagulation factors V and VIII are diminished. MCFD2 is the second gene that leads to combined deficiency of factor V-factor VIII. ERGIC-53 and MCFD2  form a protein complex and serve as a cargo receptor to transport FV and FVIII from the ER to the ERGIC and then the Golgi,as illustrated here.

Clinical significance
LMAN1 mutational inactivation is a frequent and early event potentially contributing to colorectal tumorigenesis.

References

Further reading